The 1906 Massachusetts gubernatorial election was held on November 6, 1906. Incumbent Republican Governor Curtis Guild Jr. was re-elected for a second one-year term, defeating Suffolk District Attorney John B. Moran.

Party nominations
John B. Moran won the Prohibition Party and Independence League nominations by acclamation. Incumbent Governor Curtis Guild Jr. won the Republican nomination without opposition.

General election

Results

Governor

See also
 1906 Massachusetts legislature

References

Governor
1906
Massachusetts
November 1906 events